Ve is a village in the district of Tveit in Kristiansand municipality in Agder county, Norway. The small village lies along the Norwegian National Road 41, along the river Tovdalselva. The village lies across the river from Kristiansand Airport, Kjevik.

See also
List of short place names

References

Villages in Agder
Geography of Kristiansand